The Balleny hotspot is a volcanic hotspot located in the Southern Ocean. Due to plate tectonics the hot spot was under different parts of the ocean bed in the past, and this has resulted in a chain of seamounts extending from the East Tasman Plateau. Isotopes and trace elements in the volcanic rocks indicated a high U/Pb mantle source. The same pattern is seen in basalt from Tasmania, but not from Victoria.

References

Hotspots of the Southern Ocean
Geography of the Balleny Islands